Matsunaga is a Japanese surname. Notable people with the surname include:

Daniel Matsunaga, Japanese-Brazilian model, actor and football player currently based in the Philippines
Enzo Matsunaga, author
Futoshi Matsunaga, Japanese serial killer
Hikaru Matsunaga, Japanese legislator and finance minister
Hisahide Matsunaga, daimyō of the Matsunaga clan in the Sengoku period
Mari Matsunaga, founder of i-mode mobile service and Seiko Epson board director 
Masahiro Matsunaga, racing driver
Masatoshi Matsunaga, Imperial Army Lieutenant General and Baron, Second Class
Mitsuhiro Matsunaga, Japanese professional wrestler
Sadaichi Matsunaga, Imperial Japanese Navy Vice Admiral
, Japanese sport wrestler
Spark Matsunaga, United States Senator from Hawaii
, Japanese footballer
Toh Matsunaga, Chairman of the 45th House of Representative
Yoshisuke Matsunaga, Japanese mathematician of the 18th century
, Japanese voice actress

Fictional characters
Mikage Matsunaga, a character from anime and manga series Miracle Girls
Tomomi Matsunaga, a character from anime and manga series Miracle Girls

Japanese-language surnames